Lamo (also called mBo;; ’Bo skad) is an unclassified Sino-Tibetan language spoken in Tshawarong, Zogang County, Chamdo Prefecture, Tibet. It was recently documented by Suzuki & Nyima (2016). sMad skad, a closely related language variety, is also spoken in Tshawarong.

Suzuki & Nyima (2018) document the Kyilwa (格瓦) variety of Dongba Township (东坝乡).

Names
Lamo is referred to by the Changdu Gazetteer (2005: 819) as Dongba (东坝话), as it is spoken in Dongba Township (东坝乡), Zogang County. Jiang (2022) also refers to the language as Dongba (东坝话).

Khams Tibetan people refer to Lamo speakers as mBo or mBo mi (’bo mi). Traditionally, Lamo speakers also referred to themselves as Po mi, although this autonym is not known by all Lamo speakers. They refer to their own language as Lamo. Some Lamo speakers also refer to their town language as ˊmbo hkə.

Lamo autonyms by location (gSerkhu, discussed below, is a minor mutually intelligible variety):

Demographics
Lamo is spoken by about 4,000 speakers, with 2,000 in Dongba Township, and 2,000 in Zhonglinka Township. Both townships are located along the Nujiang River in Dzogang County.

Lamo and gSerkhu villages by township:

Dialects
There are two dialects:
Lamo (Tibetan name for the language: mBo-skad)
Lamei

There are 5 Lamo-speaking village clusters in Dongba Township, which are Kyilwa, Phurkha, Gewa, Gyastod and Gyasmed. The remaining village clusters, out of a total of 13 village clusters in Dongba Township, are Khams Tibetan-speaking villages.

Lamei is spoken by 1,500 to 2,000 people in 5 village clusters in is spoken in Zhonglinka Township. Sitrikhapa, Wangtod, Wangmed, Rongba, and Laba village clusters have only Lamei speakers. Woba, Pula, and Zuoshod village clusters have both Lamei and Khams Tibetan speakers.

gSerkhu is a variety of Lamo, with which it is mutually intelligible. Khams Tibetan speakers refer to the language as Sikhu. gSerkhu is spoken by about 400 people (80 households) in 4 villages of the gSerkhu Valley, which are Benzhui, Muzong, Cuixi, and Sangba, all located in Shangchayu Town, Dzayul County. Dzayul County also has Khams Tibetan speakers who had originally migrated from the Lamo-speaking area of Dongba Township, Dzogang County. Jiang (2022) refers to the language as Suku or Sukuhua (素苦话).

Classification
Suzuki & Nyima (2016, 2018) suggest that Lamo may be a Qiangic language. Guillaume Jacques (2016) suggests that mBo is a rGyalrongic language belonging to the Stau-Khroskyabs (Horpa-Lavrung) branch.

Suzuki & Nyima (2018) note that Lamo is closely related to two other recently documented languages of Chamdo, eastern Tibet, namely Larong (spoken in the Lancang River valley of Zogang County and Markam County) and Drag-yab (spoken in southern Zhag'yab County). These languages together are called the Chamdo languages.

Lamo compared with Written Tibetan and Proto-Tibeto-Burman (Nyima & Suzuki 2019):

Lexicon
Suzuki & Nyima (2016) list the following Lamo words.

Phonology 
Suzuki & Nyima (2018) report the phonology of the Kyilwa dialect. They have drawn the conclusion that Lamo "tends to have a different phonetic development from the others".

Consonants: /ph, p, b, th, t, d, ʈ, ʈh, ɖ, kh, k, g, qh, q, ɢ, ʔ, tsh, ts, dz, tɕh, tɕ, dʑ, s, z, ʂ, ɕ, ʑ, x, ɣ, χ, ʁ, h, ɦ, m, m̥, n, n̥, ȵ, ȵ̊, ŋ, ŋ̊, ɴ, ɴ̥, l, l̥, r, w, j/.

Vowels: /i, e, ɛ, a, ɑ, ɔ, o, u, ɯ, ə, ʉ, ɵ/. All of these vowels have creaky and nasalized counterparts. There are a few secondary articulations found marginally, namely retroflexed /ɚ/ and velarized /əɣ/.

The tones are high and rising, the same as in Larong and Drag-yab. The tone bearing unit is the first two syllables of every word. The second syllable is occasionally excluded from the TBU.

Morphology
Directional prefixes in Lamo:
n-: ˊnə- sə̰ ‘kill’, ˊna-qɑ ‘chew’, ˊnu-pho ‘drop’
th-: ˊtho-xɯ ‘go’, ˊtho-ndzo ‘gather’, ˊthe-ji ‘sell’
k-: ˊka-tɵ ‘buy’, ˉko’-ɕa ‘break into pieces’
t-: ˉtu’-rɑ ‘receive’, ˉtə’-tɕa ‘wear (a hat)’
l-: ˉla’-mbo ‘overthrow’
w-: ˉwo’-ɕa ‘tear up’, ˊwu-ndzə ‘eat’

Directional prefixes with le ‘come’ in Lamo:
ˊne-le: ‘come downwards/come down’
ˊthe-le: ‘(he) has arrived’ (perfect/aorist only)
k-: (does not occur)
ˊtə’-le: ‘arrive upwards/come here close to the speaker’
ˉle-le: ‘come to a place closer to the speaker but not necessarily near them’
ˊwu-le: ‘come towards the speaker on the same horizontal level’

References

Suzuki, Hiroyuki and Tashi Nyima. 2016. ’Bo skad, a newly recognised non-Tibetic variety spoken in mDzo sgang, TAR: a brief introduction to its sociolinguistic situation, sounds, and vocabulary. Fourth Workshop on Sino-Tibetan Languages of Southwest China (STLS-2016). University of Washington, Seattle, September 8–10, 2016.
Suzuki, Hiroyuki and Tashi Nyima. 2017. Outline of verb morphology of Lamo (mDzo sgang, Tibet). Paper presented at 50th International Conference for Sino-Tibetan Languages and Linguistics (Beijing).
Suzuki, Hiroyuki and Tashi Nyima. 2018. Historical relationship among three non-Tibetic languages in Chamdo, TAR. Proceedings of the 51st International Conference on Sino-Tibetan Languages and Linguistics (2018). Kyoto: Kyoto University.

Unclassified Sino-Tibetan languages
Languages of China
Languages of Tibet